Loryn Phiri (born 4 November 1998) is a Zimbabwean cricketer who plays for the Zimbabwe women's national cricket team.

In January 2019, Phiri was named in Zimbabwe's Women's Twenty20 International (WT20I) squad for their five-match series against Namibia. The matches were the first WT20I matches to be played by Zimbabwe since the International Cricket Council (ICC) awarded WT20I status to all of its members in July 2018. She made her WT20I debut on 5 January 2019, for Zimbabwe against Namibia. In October 2021, Phiri was named in Zimbabwe's Women's One Day International (WODI) squad for their four-match series against Ireland. The fixtures were the first WODI matches after Zimbabwe also gained WODI status from the ICC in April 2021. She made her WODI debut on 5 October 2021, for Zimbabwe against Ireland.

In November 2021, she was named in Zimbabwe's team for the 2021 Women's Cricket World Cup Qualifier tournament in Zimbabwe.

References

External links

1998 births
Living people
Zimbabwean women cricketers
Zimbabwe women One Day International cricketers
Zimbabwe women Twenty20 International cricketers
Place of birth missing (living people)
Mountaineers women cricketers